The Hunter of Fall is a 1956 German drama film directed by Gustav Ucicky and starring Rudolf Lenz, Traute Wassler and Erwin Strahl. It is based on the novel The Hunter of Fall by Ludwig Ganghofer. A Bavarian poacher battles a gamekeeper.

Cast
Rudolf Lenz as Friedl
Traute Wassler as Marel
Erwin Strahl as Blasi
 as Senner Lenzl
Paul Richter as Dr. Harlander
Kurt Großkurth as Niedergstötter, customs officer
Alfred Pongratz as Quack
Ernst Firnholzer as forester von Fall
Ernst Reinhold as Simerl, poacher
Beppo Schwaiger as Anderl, hunting assistant
Peter Mühlen as Göri, poacher

References

External links

1956 films
1956 drama films
German drama films
West German films
1950s German-language films
Films directed by Gustav Ucicky
Remakes of German films
Films based on The Hunter of Fall
1950s German films